Seyidlər (also, Seidlyar and Seydlyar) is a village and municipality in the Khachmaz Rayon of Azerbaijan.  It has a population of 378.

References 

Populated places in Khachmaz District